Michael Shank (born September 22, 1966) is an American race car team owner and former race car driver born in Columbus, Ohio.  Before leaving driving to concentrate on car ownership, he ran one race in the 1996–97 Indy Racing League season, the 1997 Las Vegas 500K at Las Vegas Motor Speedway.  He started racing in 1989, winning SCCA Ohio Valley Region's Novice Driver of the Year.  He also won the 1996 Player’s/Toyota Atlantic C2 championship.
As an owner of Meyer Shank Racing, he was car owner for Sam Hornish Jr. when he won the 1999 Formula Atlantic series Rookie of the Year title.  In 2006, his car, driven by Justin Wilson, A. J. Allmendinger, Oswaldo Negri and Mark Patterson, finished in 2nd position overall and in the Daytona Prototype class in the Rolex 24 Hours of Daytona.  Shank has been twice named Formula Atlantic Team Owner of the Year.

Hélio Castroneves won the 2021 Indy 500 while racing for the team. It was Castroneves' career record-tying 4th Indy 500 victory, and the team's first-ever victory in the IndyCar Series.

Meyer Shank Racing

American open-wheel racing results
(key) (Races in bold indicate pole position)

SCCA National Championship Runoffs

IndyCar

References

External links

1966 births
Atlantic Championship drivers
Living people
IndyCar Series drivers
IndyCar Series team owners
IndyCar Series teams
Sportspeople from Columbus, Ohio
Racing drivers from Columbus, Ohio
Racing drivers from Ohio
Meyer Shank Racing drivers